Herbert Mariner Wood (May 10, 1877 – 1966) was a Canadian politician. He served in the Legislative Assembly of New Brunswick as member of the Progressive Conservative party representing Westmorland County from 1925 to 1935.

References

1877 births
1966 deaths
Progressive Conservative Party of New Brunswick MLAs